Trafic is a 2004 Romanian short film directed by Cătălin Mitulescu. It depicts a brief moment in the mundanities of urban life and family life, and a man's quick decision to escape them, if only just for a moment. It won the Short Film Palme d'Or at the 2004 Cannes Film Festival. It is said to have been the "instigating" film of the Romanian New Wave.

See also
 Romanian New Wave

References

External links
 
 Trafic (2004) at Vimeo

Films directed by Cătălin Mitulescu
2004 short films
2004 films
Romanian short films